Danny Langtree (born 18 February 1991) is a professional rugby league footballer who plays as a forward for Barrow Raiders in the RFL Championship.
He spent two spells at Oldham RLFC (Heritage № 1302) and is their highest try scorer.

Background
Langtree was born in St Helens, Merseyside, England.

Career
Daniel Langtree played his junior rugby league for the Blackbrook Royals and was a product of the St Helens Academy system. In 2009 he was sacked by the Saints and banned from rugby for two years for failing a drugs test after being found to have traces of cocaine in his system.

Langtree previously played for Hull F.C. in the Super League until his contract was terminated in April 2019, and Oldham in the Kingstone Press Championship and Betfred League 1.

Barrow Raiders
On 13 October 2021, it was reported that he had signed for Barrow in the RFL Championship.

References

External links

Hull FC profile
Oldham profile

1991 births
Living people
Barrow Raiders players
Doncaster R.L.F.C. players
Doping cases in rugby league
English rugby league players
Oldham R.L.F.C. players
Rugby league second-rows
Rugby league locks
Rugby league players from St Helens, Merseyside